The Safecracker is a 1958 British crime film noir directed by Ray Milland and starring Milland, Barry Jones and Victor Maddern.

Plot
Colley Dawson lives a quiet life at home with his mother, but he is an expert safecracker at weekends, breaking into wealthy homes and stealing valuable art. When he is eventually arrested and convicted, Colley is approached in prison by Major Adbury, who offers him a deal in exchange for helping with the war effort. Colley will be given his freedom if he uses his safecracking expertise to perform a mission behind enemy lines. The dangerous mission is to breach a difficult safe in a Nazi chateau and steal a list of German spies operating in England. Colley agrees and is trained as a commando and parachuted into Belgium for the mission.

Cast
 Ray Milland as Colley Dawson
 Barry Jones as Bennett Carfield
 Jeanette Sterke as Irene
 Victor Maddern as Morris
 Ernest Clark as Major Adbury
 Cyril Raymond as Inspector Frankham
 Melissa Stribling as Angela
 Percy Herbert as Sergeant Harper
 Barbara Everest as Mrs. Dawson
 Anthony Nicholls as General Prior
 David Horne as Herbert Fenwright
 Colin Gordon as Dakers
 Clive Morton as Sir George Turvey
 John Welsh as Inspector Owing
 Colin Tapley as Colonel Charles Mercer
 Ian MacNaughton as Thomson
 Charles Lloyd-Pack as Lambert
 Ferdy Mayne as Greek Ship Owner
 Arnold Bell as Detective
 Bernard Fox as Shafter
 Jackie Collins as Fenwright's Secretary 
 Basil Dignam as Air Vice Marshal
 Sam Kydd as McCullers
 Hilda Fenemore as Mrs. McCullers
 David Lodge as Parachute Instructor
 Richard Marner as German N.C.O

Production
The film was originally known as The Tale of Willie Gordon. Ray Milland left for England in June 1957.

In December 1957, producer David E. Rose announced that he and Milland would produce a second film together, but the project did not materialise.

Reception

Critical
In The New York Times, Bosley Crowther called the film "a good, not great, suspense thriller," adding, "The film is full of those tense situations in which the hero slips into a room and opens a safe in terrifying silence. Mr. Milland is good in it. So is Barry Jones."

Box office
According to MGM records, the film earned $280,000 in the U.S. and Canada and $675,000 elsewhere, resulting in a profit of $59,000.

References

External links
 
 
 
 

1958 films
British World War II films
British black-and-white films
1958 crime films
Films directed by Ray Milland
Films scored by Richard Rodney Bennett
Metro-Goldwyn-Mayer films
1950s English-language films
1950s British films